Kiltiernan Church is a medieval church and National Monument in County Galway, Ireland.

Location

Kiltiernan Church is located 2.9 km (1.8 miles) south-southeast of Kilcolgan, east of Tullynafrankagh Lough.

History

There are no written records of Kiltiernan. It is believed to have been founded by a Saint Tiernan in the 5th century AD, with the surviving stone church dating to the 8th century.

When it was excavated, an enclosure wall not parallel to the church was found.

Buildings
A stone church with a flat-headed trabeate doorway, sloping jambs and single lintel; and a chancel added later. The east window is triangle-headed and formed of two stones.

The outlines of over 20 structures (mostly house-sites) can be discerned as mounds, and over 16 sub-enclosures.

References

Religion in County Galway
Archaeological sites in County Galway
National Monuments in County Galway
Former churches in the Republic of Ireland